The Nka language (Ninka, Aninka) is a Plateau language of Nigeria. Mutual intelligibility with the related Gbantu language is low.

Phonology

Consonants

Vowels
 

/ə/ is an uncertain transcription, and may be a centralized allophone of /i/.

References
Blench (2008) Prospecting proto-Plateau. Manuscript.

Ninzic languages
Languages of Nigeria